Agomani railway station is a small regular train station under Northeast Frontier railway zone in Dhubri district of Assam.

References

Railway stations in Dhubri district
Railway stations opened in 2010
Alipurduar railway division